The Religious Instruction of the Negroes in the United States by Charles Colcock Jones Sr. was published in 1843. The book includes four parts, the first giving a history of the African slave trade. Colcock, himself a minister and plantation owner, called on slave owners and ministers to provide religious instruction to slaves.

References
https://archive.org/details/religiousinstruc00lcjone

External links
The book online

1843 non-fiction books
Non-fiction books about American slavery
Christianity and slavery